Sherman W. Eckley (February 27, 1866 – May 4, 1928) was an American businessman and politician.

Born in Peoria, Illinois, Eckley was in the jewelry business and served as the commissioner of public workers for the city of Peoria. He served in the Illinois House of Representatives from 1927 until his death. He was a Republican. Eckley died in Peoria after a short illness.

Notes

External links

1866 births
1928 deaths
Politicians from Peoria, Illinois
Businesspeople from Illinois
American jewellers
Republican Party members of the Illinois House of Representatives